Isham is an unincorporated community in Scott County, Tennessee, United States.

Notes

Unincorporated communities in Scott County, Tennessee
Unincorporated communities in Tennessee